Marcelo Zormann da Silva (born 10 June 1996 in Lins, São Paulo) is a Brazilian tennis player.

Zormann along with Orlando Luz won the 2014 Wimbledon boys' doubles title after defeating Stefan Kozlov and Andrey Rublev 6–4, 3–6, 8–6 in the final.

Zormann has a career high ATP singles ranking of 467 achieved on 13 June 2016. He also has an ATP career high doubles ranking of 264 achieved on 6 August 2018.

ATP Challenger and ITF Futures finals

Singles: 6 (3–3)

Doubles: 34 (20–14)

Junior Grand Slam finals

Boys' doubles

Olympic medal matches

Doubles

External links
 
 

1996 births
Living people
Brazilian people of German descent
Brazilian male tennis players
Wimbledon junior champions
Sportspeople from São Paulo (state)
Sportspeople from Porto Alegre
Tennis players at the 2014 Summer Youth Olympics
Tennis players at the 2015 Pan American Games
Youth Olympic gold medalists for Brazil
Grand Slam (tennis) champions in boys' doubles
Pan American Games competitors for Brazil
People from Lins, São Paulo